USS Martin H. Ray (DE-338) was an Edsall-class destroyer escort built for the U.S. Navy during World War II. She served in the Atlantic Ocean and the Pacific Ocean and provided destroyer escort protection against submarine and air attack for Navy vessels and convoys.

Namesake
Martin H. Ray Jr. was born on 9 August 1913, in Philadelphia, Pennsylvania. He was educated in Yonkers, New York. After one year at New York University he entered the U.S. Naval Academy, graduating with the class of 1934.

While assisting the stricken  in the last stages of the Battle of Midway on 6 June 1942, Hammann was hit by an Imperial Japanese Navy torpedo. Lieutenant Ray as engineering officer died attempting to save the rapidly sinking vessel and evacuate the space below decks. He was posthumously awarded the Navy Cross.

Construction and commissioning
She was laid down 27 October 1943 by Consolidated Steel Corp., Orange, Texas; launched 23 December 1943; sponsored by Mrs. M. H. Ray, Jr., widow of Lt. Ray, and commissioned 28 February 1944.

World War II North Atlantic operations
 
After a month's shakedown cruise to Bermuda, Martin H. Ray spent 3 weeks at Norfolk, Virginia, training prospective destroyer escort crews. June 1944 marked the beginning of a 12-month period in which not one ship was lost by the 14 convoys she escorted. Coastal assignments yielded to transatlantic voyages when she sailed from Norfolk, 1 July, bound for Naples, Italy. After two voyages to Italy she departed New York 20 October on the first of five voyages to the British Isles and France. Besides depth charging every probable submarine contact Martin H. Ray and the other escorts honed their professional effectiveness by additional training periods at the conclusion of each of these passages.

Transfer to the Pacific Fleet 
 
Following Nazi Germany's collapse, new orders directed the ship to Guantanamo Bay, Cuba, for training before joining the Pacific Fleet. She transited the Panama Canal. 2 August 1945, and was at Pearl Harbor when the conflict ceased. All abbreviated Operation Magic Carpet voyage terminated at San Diego, California, 11 September, with the debarkation of 58 military passengers.

Post-War Decommissioning 

Two days later she sailed to the Philadelphia Navy Yard to prepare for assignment to the Atlantic Reserve Fleet. Martin H. Ray decommissioned in March 1946, at Green Cove Springs, Florida, and was struck from the Navy list 1 May 1966. The following September she was scrapped.

References

External links
 Dictionary of American Naval Fighting Ships
 NavSource Online: Destroyer Escort Photo Archive - USS Martin H. Ray (DE- 338)

Edsall-class destroyer escorts
Ships built in Orange, Texas
1943 ships
World War II frigates and destroyer escorts of the United States